Takiéta is a town in south central Niger, in Mirriah Department, Zinder Region. It lies along the Route Nationale 1 (Niger), the nation's primary east-west highway, roughly halfway between Zinder and Tessaoua.

References

Populated places in Niger
Zinder Region